The Council of State in Ghana is a small body of prominent citizens, analogous to the Council of Elders in the traditional political system, which advises the President on national issues.

The Council of State was established by Articles 89 to 92 of the 1992 Constitution of Ghana: "There shall be a Council of State to counsel the President in the performance of his functions."

Membership
The Council of State should include a former Chief Justice of Ghana, a former Chief of the Defence Staff and a former Inspector General of Police and the President of the National House of Chiefs. Each region of Ghana also has an elected representative. The President of Ghana also appoints eleven members. Members stay in office until the term of office of the president ends.

Current members
The current membership was sworn in by President Nana Akufo-Addo on 23 February 2021 at the Jubilee House. The vacant position reserved for former Chief Justice of Ghana was filled following the appointment of Georgina Theodora Wood following her retirement.

Meetings
The council is required to meet four times a year. It can also meet if requested by the President of Ghana, the Parliament of Ghana or by at least five sitting members of the council. There should be more than half the members of the Council at a meeting to form a quorum. Decisions of the council are valid if voted for by the majority of members present at the meeting. The Council regulates its own procedures subject to the provisions of the Ghana Constitution.

Past members of the Council of State

References

External links
Ghana Districts: The Council of State
GhanaWeb: The Council of State
List of members at beginning of Akuffo Addo government - graphic.com.gh

 
Government agencies established in 1992
Government of Ghana